Carneros is a former settlement in Napa County, California. It lay at an elevation of 7 feet (2 m).

Carneros was named for the Rancho Rincon de los Carneros. A post office functioned at Carneros from 1867 to 1868.

References

Former settlements in Napa County, California
Former populated places in California